Chilgazi is a village and jamoat in northern Tajikistan. It is part of the city of Isfara in Sughd Region. The jamoat has a total population of 15,997 (2015).

Agriculture 

Chilgazi is a place where gardening is very much developed. Many fruits as apricots, apples, cherries are produced in Chilgazi. People dry apricots during the summer.

Education 

There are several schools in Chilgazi. School  36, 37 55, 66. This jamoat has cinema, two libraries and several tea-houses.

References

Populated places in Sughd Region
Jamoats of Tajikistan